Byala Reka (Bulgarian for "White River") may refer to:

 Byala Reka (Luda Reka tributary), a river in the Rhodope Mountains of Bulgaria

 Byala Reka, Plovdiv Province, a village in Bulgaria
 Byala Reka, Shumen Province, a village in north-eastern Bulgaria
 , a village in Rudozem Municipality, south-eastern Bulgaria
 , a village in Suhindol Municipality, north-central Bulgaria

See also 
 White River (disambiguation)
 Bela Reka (disambiguation)
 Bijela Rijeka (disambiguation)